2,4-Dinitrophenol (2,4-DNP or simply DNP) is an organic compound with the formula HOC6H3(NO2)2. It is a yellow, crystalline solid that has a sweet, musty odor. It sublimates, is volatile with steam, and is soluble in most organic solvents as well as aqueous alkaline solutions. When in a dry form, it is a high explosive and has an instantaneous explosion hazard. It is a precursor to other chemicals and is biochemically active, uncoupling oxidative phosphorylation from the electron transport chain in cells with mitochondria, by allowing hydrogen cations to pass from the intermembrane space into the mitochondrial matrix. Oxidative phosphorylation is a highly regulated step in aerobic respiration that is inhibited, among other factors, by normal cellular levels of ATP. Uncoupling it results in chemical energy from diet and energy stores such as triglycerides being wasted as heat with minimal regulation, leading to dangerously high body temperatures that may develop into heatstroke. Its use as a dieting aid has been identified with severe side-effects, including a number of deaths.

Uses

Historically, DNP has been used as an antiseptic and as a non-selective bioaccumulating pesticide.

DNP was particularly useful as a herbicide alongside other closely related dinitrophenol herbicides like 2,4-dinitro-o-cresol (DNOC), dinoseb and dinoterb. Since 1998 DNP has been withdrawn from agricultural use. Currently, there are no actively registered pesticides containing DNP in the United States or Europe. Dinoseb is used industrially as a polymerisation inhibitor during styrene production. In 2023 after extensive consultation the Home Office couldn't determine any legitimate industrial DNP uses in the United Kingdom.

It is a chemical intermediate in the production of sulfur dyes, wood preservatives and picric acid. DNP has also been used to make photographic developers and explosives (see shellite). DNP is classified as an explosive in the United Kingdom and the United States.

Although DNP is widely considered too dangerous for clinical use, its mechanism of action remains under investigation as a potential approach for treating obesity. As of 2015, research is being conducted on uncoupling proteins naturally found in humans.

Biochemistry
In living cells, DNP acts as a proton ionophore, an agent that can shuttle protons (hydrogen cations) across biological membranes. It dissipates the proton gradient across the mitochondria membranes, collapsing the proton motive force that the cell uses to produce most of its ATP chemical energy. Instead of producing ATP, the energy of the proton gradient is lost as heat.

DNP is often used in biochemistry research to help explore the bioenergetics of chemiosmotic and other membrane transport processes.

Mechanism of action 
DNP acts as a protonophore, allowing protons to leak across the inner mitochondrial membrane and thus bypass ATP synthase. This makes ATP energy production less efficient. In effect, part of the energy that is normally produced from cellular respiration is wasted as heat. The inefficiency is proportional to the dose of DNP that is taken. As the dose increases and energy production is made more inefficient, metabolic rate increases (and more fat is burned) in order to compensate for the inefficiency and to meet energy demands. DNP is probably the best known agent for uncoupling oxidative phosphorylation. The phosphorylation of adenosine diphosphate (ADP) by ATP synthase gets disconnected or uncoupled from oxidation.

From the Journal of Clinical Toxicology, Volume 44, Issue 3 (2006):

Pharmacokinetics
Information about pharmacokinetics of DNP in humans is limited. The ATSDR's Toxicological Profile for Dinitrophenols remarks that DNP elimination appears to be rapid except when liver function is impaired. The NEJM remarks that DNP appears to be eliminated in around three to four days, except possibly when the liver and kidneys are damaged. Other papers give a wide array of possible half-lives, ranging from 3 hours to 5–14 days, while still other, more recent papers maintain that the half-life in humans is unknown.

Hazards

Toxicity
DNP is considered to have high acute toxicity. In March 2020 a UK judge stated "there is no antidote or remedy for DNP once taken. In consequence, DNP has a high mortality rate ⁠— ⁠of those who presented at hospital between 2007 and 2019 with a history of having taken DNP, 18% died. This puts DNP close to cyanide in terms of its toxicity." The study published in 2021 indicates that the worldwide cases fatality overall was 11.9% between 2010 and 2020. Other than increasing metabolic rate, acute oral exposure to DNP has resulted in nausea, vomiting, sweating, dizziness, headache, and loss of weight. Chronic oral exposure to DNP can lead to the formation of cataracts and skin lesions and has caused effects on the bone marrow, central nervous system, and cardiovascular system. Contact with skin or inhalation can cause DNP poisoning. In 2009, an incident occurred in a Chinese chemical factory and 20 persons suffered acute DNP poisoning.

The factor that limits ever-increasing doses of DNP is not a lack of ATP energy production, but rather an excessive rise in body temperature due to the heat produced during uncoupling. Accordingly, DNP overdose will cause fatal hyperthermia, with body temperature rising to as high as  shortly before death. Case reports have shown that an acute administration of 10–20 milligrams per kilogram of body weight in humans can be lethal. The lowest published fatal ingested dose is 4.3 mg/kg. In the three separate publicly published medical management cases, a single dose of few tablets from an online retailer (tablet dose unknown) has proven fatal.

The United Kingdom's Food Standards Agency identifies DNP as "an industrial chemical known to have serious short-term and long-term effects, which can be extremely dangerous to human health" and advises "consumers not to take any product containing DNP at any level. This chemical is not suitable for human consumption." Since February 2017 DNP has been included in Australia SUSMP Schedule 10, "Substances of such a danger to health as to warrant prohibition of sale, supply and use" From December 2018 DNP has been classified as an "illegal poisonous substance" in Russia. From 1st October 2023 DNP will be included in the United Kingdom Control of Explosives Precursors and Poisons Regulations 2023 as a regulated poison.

Chemical hazards 
A dust explosion is possible with DNP in powder or granular form in the presence of air. DNP may explosively decompose when submitted to shock, friction or concussion, and may explode upon heating. DNP forms explosive salts with strong bases as well as ammonia, and emits toxic fumes of nitrogen dioxide when heated to decomposition. DNP's explosive strength is 81% that of TNT, based on the Trauzl lead block test. DNP was the cause of the 1916 Rainham Chemical Factory explosion which left 7 dead and 69 injured. DNP is listed on the Homeland Security Anti-Terrorism Chemicals of Interest list.

Synthesis

DNP is produced by hydrolysis of 1-chloro-2,4-dinitrobenzene. Another route of DNP synthesis is by nitration of phenol with nitric acid.

History and society 

DNP was widely used in explosive mixtures around the world. Examples include Shellite in the UK, Tridite in the US, Tridita in Spain, MDPC/DD in France, MABT/MBT in Italy, and DNP in the Soviet Union. During World War I, 36 munition factory workers in France and 27 in the US lost their lives through DNP poisoning. 2,4-dinitrophenol was widely used by Red Army soldiers to make them more resilient to the cold during World War II.

Three fatalities were reported in dye factories, where DNP was used to make sulfur black dye.

DNP was used extensively in diet pills from 1933 to 1938 after Cutting and Tainter at Stanford University made their first report on how the compound substantially increased metabolic rate. This effect occurs via DNP acting as a proton ionophore. After only its first year on the market, Tainter estimated that at least 100,000 people had been treated with DNP in the United States, in addition to many others abroad.

In light of the adverse effects and fatal hyperthermia caused by DNP when it was used clinically, the dose was slowly titrated according to personal tolerance, which varies greatly. Concerns about dangerous side-effects and rapidly developing cataracts resulted in DNP being discontinued in the United States by the end of 1938. In 1938, the FDA included DNP in a list of drugs potentially so toxic that they should not be used even under a physician's supervision."In studies of intermediate-duration oral exposure to 2,4-DNP, cases of death from agranulocytosis (described in the discussion of Hematological Effects) have been attributed to 2,4-DNP. These cases occurred during the usual dosing regimens for weight loss, employing increasing doses in one case from 2.9 to 4.3 mg/kg/day of 2,4-DNP for 6 weeks (Dameshek and Gargill 1934); a dose of 1.03 mg/kg/day 2,4-DNP for 46 days in another case (Goldman and Haber 1936); and in another, from 0.62 to 3.8 mg/kg/day 2,4-DNP as sodium 2,4-DNP for 41 days (Silver 1934). In all cases, the patients were under medical supervision."Back in 1952 UK enacted new Agriculture (Poisonous Substances) Act to control very dangerous poisons, such as DNP and DNOC. Dinitrophenol was included in the Poisons Act 1972 poisons list order 1972. However DNP was dropped from the list in 1982. In 2021 December Home Office have launched a public consultation on potential amendments to the Poisons Act 1972. This consultation includes a proposal to add 2,4-Dinitrophenol (DNP) to the Poisons Act as a regulated poison.

DNP, however, continues to be used by some bodybuilders and athletes to rapidly lose body fat. Fatal overdoses include cases of accidental exposure, suicide, and excessive intentional exposure (overdose). The substance's use as a dieting aid has also led to a number of accidental fatalities, including 33 confirmed DNP-related deaths in the UK since 2007. Annual Reports of the American Association of Poison Control Centers identify 26 DNP poisoning fatalities between 2013 and 2021 in the US. The Swedish Poisons Information Centre has reported three fatal DNP cases between June 2012 and May 2013. "Forensic analysis of DNP is not routinely performed so the true number of DNP deaths may be higher." DNP may not be detected in post mortem blood samples.

In 2003, a vendor of DNP was sentenced to five years in prison for mail fraud, with the FDA's OCI investigators having gathered evidence that the vendor's encapsulation of DNP was neither accurate nor sanitary. One of his customers died and another was hospitalized in a coma for more than 10 days. In 2018, a seller in the United Kingdom was convicted of manslaughter for selling DNP as "fatburner" for human consumption. The conviction was sent to retrial in 2020 by the English Court of Appeal, where the seller was, once again, convicted of gross negligence manslaughter. In 2019, a company selling DNP in the UK was found "guilty of placing an unsafe food product on the market" and fined £100,000. The director of the company was given a suspended prison sentence. A seller in California was sentenced to three years in prison for selling DNP as diet pills. In 2020, a man from North Carolina was sentenced to the maximum sentence of seven years in prison after three of his customers died from DNP poisoning. In 2021 a woman from Texas was sentenced to 6 months in federal prison for selling DNP to consumers. The same year a man from Oregon was sentenced to one year and one day in federal prison for selling DNP as a weight-loss product. December 2021 a man from UK was sentenced to 28 months in prison for selling DNP as a diet pill for weight loss on the darknet.

References

Further reading

External links
 
 General 2,4-dinitrophenol information. 
 CLH Report for 2,4-dinitrophenol – ECHA.
 Harmonised classification and labelling at EU level of 2,4-dinitrophenol
 Safety Data Sheet. Alfa Aesar Thermo Fisher Scientific Chemicals 2,4-Dinitrophenol SDS. August 2019. Retrieved 5 October 2019.
 Toxicological Profile for Dinitrophenols 2019

Withdrawn drugs
Antiobesity drugs
Dinitrophenols
Ionophores
Uncoupling agents
Rodenticides
Explosive chemicals
Sweet-smelling chemicals